Stendlitz is a river of Mecklenburg-Vorpommern, Germany. Four Kilometers from its source in a wetland named Moosbruch, it passes Domjüchsee. From there it passes through Strelitz-Alt, where it is led in culverts. It discharges into a canal and river named Floßgraben in Lake Tiefer Trebbower See near Klein Trebbow.

See also
List of rivers of Mecklenburg-Vorpommern

Rivers of Mecklenburg-Western Pomerania
Rivers of Germany